The following highways are numbered 290:

Brazil
 BR-290

Canada
Manitoba Provincial Road 290

Japan
 Japan National Route 290

United States
  Interstate 290 (multiple highways)
  U.S. Route 290
  Arkansas Highway 290
 Florida:
  Florida State Road 290 (former)
 County Road 290 (Escambia County, Florida)
  Georgia State Route 290 (former)
  Kentucky Route 290
  Maryland Route 290
  Minnesota State Highway 290 (former)
  Montana Secondary Highway 290
  Nevada State Route 290
  New Mexico State Road 290
 New York:
  New York State Route 290
  County Route 290 (Erie County, New York)
  Ohio State Route 290 (former)
  Pennsylvania Route 290
  South Carolina Highway 290
  Tennessee State Route 290
 Texas:
  Texas State Highway 290
  Texas State Highway Spur 290
  Farm to Market Road 290 (former)
  Utah State Route 290
  Virginia State Route 290
  Washington State Route 290
  Wyoming Highway 290